Curling was a demonstration sport at the 1988 Winter Olympics. The venue was the Max Bell Arena in Calgary. The 1988 Winter Olympics was the second time curling was a demonstration sport at the Winter Games, previously being competed at the 1932 Olympics.

Medal summary

Medal table

Medalists

Men

Teams

*throws third stones

Standings

Round robin results

Draw 1

Draw 2

Draw 3

Draw 4

Draw 5

Draw 6

Draw 7

Tie-breakers

Playoffs

Semifinal

Gold medal match

Women

Teams

Standings

Round robin results

Draw 1

Draw 2

Draw 3

Draw 4

Draw 5

Draw 6

Draw 7

Tie-breakers

Playoffs

Semifinal

Gold medal match

References

 
Curling in Alberta
1988 in Canadian curling
Olympics
1988 Winter Olympics events
1988
International curling competitions hosted by Canada
Men's events at the 1988 Winter Olympics
Women's events at the 1988 Winter Olympics